Samantha Harvey (born October 13, 1972) is a Brazilian modern pentathlete. She placed 25th in the women's individual event at the 2004 Summer Olympics.

Harvey was born in New York City and originally competed for the USA, and finished in fourth at the 1999 Pan American Games in Winnipeg, Canada. She is a Professor of English at Boise State University in Idaho.University website

References

1972 births
Living people
Brazilian female modern pentathletes
Olympic modern pentathletes of Brazil
Modern pentathletes at the 2004 Summer Olympics
Pan American Games medalists in modern pentathlon
Pan American Games silver medalists for Brazil
Modern pentathletes at the 1999 Pan American Games
Modern pentathletes at the 2003 Pan American Games
American female modern pentathletes
Medalists at the 2003 Pan American Games
Alumni of Jesus College, Cambridge
Harvard University alumni
21st-century American women